"Boys & Girls" is a song by American rapper will.i.am featuring American singer Pia Mia. It was released on April 8, 2016, by Interscope Records. The song samples "Break This Heartbreak" by Kylie Minogue and Fernando Garibay.

Music video 
On April 7, 2016, will.i.am uploaded the music video for "Boys & Girls" on his YouTube and Vevo account. The video was directed by Spencer Creigh.

Track listing 
Digital download
"Boys & Girls"  — 4:01

Charts

Certifications

Live performances
Will.i.am performed the song on The Voice UK final on 9 Apr 2016.

References 

2016 singles
Will.i.am songs
Pia Mia songs
Songs written by will.i.am
Song recordings produced by will.i.am
Interscope Records singles
2016 songs
Songs written by Charli XCX
Songs written by Basto (musician)
Songs written by Fernando Garibay
Songs written by Kylie Minogue